Cesare Bernazano (active c. 1530) was an Italian painter of the Renaissance period.  He was born in Milan, and painted still lifes with landscapes, animals, and fruit. The figures in his landscapes are generally painted by Cesare da Sesto. Francesco Vicentino was a pupil of his.

References

16th-century Italian painters
Italian male painters
Painters from Milan
Italian Renaissance painters
Italian still life painters
Year of birth missing
Year of death missing